Monica Eileen Baly (24 May 1914 – 12 November 1998) was an English nurse, historian of nursing, and an advocate for social change.

Early life
Monica Baly studied at the St. Hilda's School for Girls in London.

Education and career

Baly trained in the London County Council Fever Hospital followed by professional nursing training at the Middlesex Hospital. She became a chief nursing officer in 1949 for the Royal College of Nursing. Baly was also an activist working toward fair living wages for nurses through the "Raise the Roof" campaign, which resulted in a 22% pay raise. Baly lectured on social policy and the history of nursing at the National Council of Nurses and authored Nursing and Social Change in 1973. She was made a Fellow of the Royal College of Nursing in 1986.

Legacy
Baly founded the History of Nursing Society at the Royal College of Nursing, and founded a journal for nursing history. She left money for a scholarship in the area.

References

1914 births
1998 deaths
Nurses from London
English medical historians
20th-century English historians
British women historians
20th-century British women writers
Fellows of the Royal College of Nursing
British nurses